The National Ittihadi Congress Party is a political party in Morocco.

History and profile
The party was founded in October 2001. The founders were Abdelmajid Bouzoubaa and Noubir Amaoui.

In the legislative elections, 27 September 2002, the party won 1 out of 325 seats.

In 2004 the party formed an alliance with Loyalty to Democracy party, the Unified Socialist Left (GSU), the Party of the Socialist Vanguard (PADS), and the Democratic Way.

In the parliamentary election, held on 7 September 2007, the party was part of the PADS–CNI–PSU Union, that won 6 seats.

References

2001 establishments in Morocco
Political parties established in 2001
Political parties in Morocco
Socialist parties in Morocco